Astrothelium rubrostiolatum is a species of corticolous (bark-dwelling) lichen in the family Trypetheliaceae. Found in Brazil, it was formally described as a new species in 2017 by Marcela Eugenia da Silva Cáceres and André Aptroot. The type specimen was collected by the authors along a trail near a field station in the Adolfo Ducke Forest Reserve (Manaus); here it was found growing on tree bark in old-growth rainforest. The lichen has a dull yellowish thallus lacking a prothallus, with spherical to pear-shaped ascomata that are either immersed in or are below the thallus surface, typically arranged in groups of 7 to 25. The ascospores number eight per ascus, are muriform (divided in regular chambers), and measure 90–125 by 25–30 μm. The species epithet refers to the red colour in the ostioles. Thin-layer chromatography revealed the presence of an anthraquinone that was presumed to be parietin.

References

rubrostiolatum
Lichen species
Lichens described in 2017
Lichens of North Brazil
Taxa named by André Aptroot
Taxa named by Marcela Cáceres